Fred Harvey Harrington (June 24, 1912 – April 8, 1995) was an American educator and the 17th President of the University of Wisconsin-Madison from 1962 to 1970.

Career
Born in Watertown, Harrington received his Bachelor of Arts from Cornell University (1933), and his Master of Arts (1934) and Doctor of Philosophy (1937), both from New York University, where he also taught as an instructor during the 1936-1937 academic year. Upon graduating, he immediately took the post of Assistant Professor of History at the University of Wisconsin-Madison. In 1940, Harrington moved to the University of Arkansas as a full professor of history and political science, and had a brief spell as a visiting professor at West Virginia University in 1942. He earned a Guggenheim Fellowship from 1943 to 1944. Harrington returned to Madison in 1947, and also chaired the history department from 1952 to 1955.

Harrington held administrative posts at the University of Wisconsin-Madison as Assistant to the President (1957), Vice President of Academic Affairs (1958), and then as VP of the university (1962). From 1962 until 1970, he served as President. He then served as a Ford Foundation advisor in India from 1971 to 1977, and then returned to the university to continue teaching. Harrington retired in 1982 and later died of a stroke in Madison in 1995.

In 2015, an endowed professorship was named after Harrington called the Fred Harvey Harrington Professor of History at the University of Wisconsin-Madison. Alfred W. McCoy was given this chair.

The University of Wisconsin-Madison's best undergraduate thesis in history is known as the Fred Harvey Harrington Prize.

Awards
1986 - Association Indians in America Honor Award

See also
List of Guggenheim Fellowships awarded in 1943
List of presidents and chancellors of the University of Wisconsin–Madison

References

External links
UWM profile

1912 births
1995 deaths
People from Watertown, New York
Cornell University alumni
New York University alumni
New York University faculty
University of Wisconsin–Madison faculty
University of Arkansas faculty
West Virginia University faculty
Leaders of the University of Wisconsin-Madison
American expatriates in India
20th-century American academics